Piet Valkenburg ( – ) was a Dutch footballer. He was part of the Netherlands national football team, playing 1 match on 10 March 1912.

See also
 List of Dutch international footballers

References

1888 births
1950 deaths
Dutch footballers
Netherlands international footballers
People from Semarang
HBS Craeyenhout players
Association football defenders